Turnbull Point is an exposed rocky point at the west extremity of D'Urville Island. Following surveys by Falkland Islands Dependencies Survey (FIDS), 1959–61, named after David H. Turnbull, Master of the FIDS/BAS ship Shackleton, 1959–69.

Headlands of the Joinville Island group